Jimma University (JU) is a public research university located in Jimma, Oromia Region, Ethiopia. It is recognized as the leading national university, as ranked first by the Federal Ministry of Education for four successive years (2009–2012). The establishment of Jimma university dates back to 1952 when Jimma college of Agriculture was founded. The university got its current name in December 1999 following the amalgamation of Jimma College of Agriculture (founded in 1952) and Jimma Institute of Health Sciences (founded in 1983).

Overview
The university is located in the city of Jimma, situated around 352 kilometers southwest of Addis Ababa. Its grounds cover some 167 hectares. JU is Ethiopia's first innovative community-oriented educational institution of higher learning, with teaching centers for health care students in Jimma, Omo Nada, Shebe, Agaro, and Asendabo. JU is a pioneer in Public health training. It has academic and scientific collaboration with numerous national and international partners. JU also publishes the biannual Ethiopian Journal of Health Sciences, and launched the Jimma University Journal of Law in October 2007.

Academics
Jimma University is one of the largest and comprehensive public research universities in Africa. The university has more than 4,000 faculty and staff members. It also has twelve research facilities, a modern hospital, a community school, a community radio station (FM 102.0), an ICT center, libraries and revenue generating enterprises. The university is operating on four campuses and it is on the phase of establishing its fifth campus at Agaro. Currently, the university educates more than 43,000 students in 56 undergraduate and 103 postgraduate programs in regular, summer and distance education with more enrollments in the years to come.

The university has many national and international linkages and collaborations in the area of research, education and community service. Its innovative educational philosophy, staff commitment and motivation and availability of better research facility have helped the university in attracting both national and international partners.

Faculties, Institutes and Schools
The university consists of the following academic units:

 School of Graduate Studies
 Institute of Technology
 Institute of Education and Professional Development Studies
 College Of Agriculture and Veterinary Medicine
 College of Business and Economics
 College of Natural Sciences
 College of Humanities and Social Sciences
. College of Law and Governance
 College of Public Health and Medical Sciences
 School of Art
 Agaro Campus

Initiatives
Jimma University is highly committed to pioneering concepts, as reflected in its motto, the university was initially founded based on the concept of Community-Based Education (CBE). Throughout its history, the university has been committed to this scheme, and almost all of the academic curriculum are based on CBE programs. Jimma University is the first university in Africa that has established an exclusive office under the President's office to supervise all innovative programs across the university.

Jimma University College of Public Health and Medical Sciences
The establishment of the College of Health Sciences of Jimma University (JU) can be traced back to 1983 with the birth of the then Jimma Institute of Health Sciences (JIHS). The very beginning of the establishment of JIHS is marked as a continuation of the Ras Desta Damtew Health Assistant Training School established in 1967 by the Ethio-Netherlands health project in the premises of Jimma Hospital. On this foundation, the School of Nursing was established in 1983. Subsequently, the School of Medicine as well as the School of Pharmacy emerged in 1985; the School of Medical Laboratory Technology and the School of Environmental Health launched in 1987 and 1988, respectively.

Jimma University teaching Hospital (JUTH) is one of the oldest public hospitals in the country. It was established in 1922. Geographically, it is located in Jimma city 352 km southwest of the capital Addis Ababa. It has been governed under the Ethiopian government by the name of “Ras Desta Damtew Hospital” and later “Jimma Hospital" during Dergue regime and currently Jimma University Specialized Teaching Hospital.

Though old for its age, it had not made remarkable physical facility improvement for years.
However, in the later times it became evident that some side-wing buildings were constructed by different stakeholders at different times to respond to the  ever-growing pressure of service demand and clinical teaching need derived from the public and Jimma University respectively. Especially, after transfer of its ownership to Jimma University, the university has made relentless efforts in extensive renovation and expansion work to make the hospital conducive for service, teaching and research.

Cognizant of the fast growing service and teaching role of the hospital, the federal government considered construction of a new and level- best 600 bedded hospital which’ will be functional as of September  2015.

Department of Materials Science & Engineering
Department of Materials Science & Engineering, as a national role model for research-oriented departments, was established with a start-up budget of US$10 million. This is the first comprehensive department of materials science in Ethiopia, which offers all MSE programs. The main theme of the department research is nano-materials under supervision of Professor Ali Eftekhari, President of the American Nano Society.

Notable alumni
Gebisa Ejeta - 2009 World Food Prize winner (considered the Nobel prize of Agriculture)
Lia Tadesse - Ethiopia Minister of Health
Tefera Belachew - Renown nutrition professor

References

Educational institutions established in 1952
1952 establishments in Ethiopia
Universities and colleges in Oromia Region